1969 in Korea may refer to:
1969 in North Korea
1969 in South Korea